The Sacred Heart Cathedral  also called Yangdok-dong Cathedral of the Sacred Heart is a religious building that is affiliated with the Catholic Church and is located in the city of Changwon in South Gyeongsang Province, in the South part of the Asian country of South Korea.

The colored brick clad building is adorned with 2 two identical towers topped by crosses. The temple follows the Roman or Latin rite and is the principal church of the Diocese of Masan (Dioecesis Masanensis; 마산 교구) that was created by Pope Paul VI in 1966 by bull "siquidem catholicae".

The church is under the pastoral responsibility of the Bishop Constantine Bae Ki-hyen.

See also
Roman Catholicism in South Korea
Sacred Heart Cathedral (disambiguation)

References

Roman Catholic cathedrals in South Korea
Buildings and structures in Changwon